Note: In Japanese military usage, a "Type" number denoted the year it was accepted into production, according to the Japanese calendar but using only the last two digits and a different calendar). Year 98 was 1938 (after Year 99, numbering starts again at 0). Thus, any piece of equipment, from rifles to machine guns to aircraft to artillery and uniforms which was accepted in 1938 is called the "Type 98". (This can be confusing when two pieces of similar equipment share the same designation, such as the Type 89 machine gun, or the Type 1 machine gun, which shared a designation with the Imperial Japanese Army's Ho-103 machine gun.)

Type 98 may refer to:

Japanese military vehicles
 Type 98 20 mm AA Half-Track Vehicle
 Type 98 20 mm AAG Tank 
 Type 98 So-Da, utility vehicle
 Type 98 Chi-Ho Japanese Medium tank
 Type 98 Ke-Ni, a Japanese light tank

Japanese guns
 Imperial Japanese Army's version of the MG 15 machine gun
 10 cm/65 Type 98 naval gun, a 100mm naval gun used on Japanese destroyers.
 Type 98 20 mm AA Machine Cannon

Japanese military aircraft
 Aichi E11A, which was designated Type 98 Reconnaissance Seaplane
 Mitsubishi Ki-15, which was designated Navy Type 98 Reconnaissance Plane Model I
 Tachikawa Ki-36, which was designated Type 98 Direct Co-operation Aircraft

Other Japanese war material
 Type 98 officers sword, called "Shin gunto".
 Type 98 grenade
 Various Japanese Naval bombs, see List of Japanese World War II navy bombs
 A Japanese explosive, see List of Japanese World War II explosives
 a Japanese uniform, see Imperial Japanese Army Uniforms

Chinese war material
 Type 99 and Type 98 Chinese tanks
 Type 98 120 mm recoilless anti-tank rocket of the People's Liberation Army